Fulki Union is a union of Basail Upazila, Tangail District, Bangladesh.

Demographics
According to the 2011 Bangladesh census, Fulki Union had 7,356 households and a population of 29,792. The literacy rate (age 7 and over) was 48% (male: 50.6%, female: 45.8%).

See also
 Union Councils of Tangail District

References

Populated places in Tangail District
Unions of Basail Upazila